Z22 Anton Schmitt was one of six Type 1936 destroyers built for the Kriegsmarine (German Navy) in the late 1930s. Completed after the beginning of World War II in September 1939, she helped to lay an offensive minefield off the English coast that claimed one small ship. During the German invasion of Norway in April 1940, the ship was tasked to attack Narvik and was sunk during the First Naval Battle of Narvik on 10 April.

Design and description
Her crew consisted of 10 officers and 313 sailors.

The ship carried five  SK C/34 guns in single mounts with gun shields, two each superimposed, fore and aft of the superstructure. The fifth mount was positioned on top of the rear deckhouse. The guns were numbered from 1 to 5 from front to rear. Her anti-aircraft armament consisted of four  SK C/30 guns in two twin mounts abreast the rear funnel and six  C/30 guns in single mounts. The ship carried eight above-water  torpedo tubes in two power-operated mounts. Two reloads were provided for each mount. She had four depth charge launchers and mine rails could be fitted on the rear deck that had a maximum capacity of 60 mines. 'GHG' (Gruppenhorchgerät) passive hydrophones were fitted to detect submarines and an active sonar system was installed by the end of 1939.

Construction and career
Z22 Anton Schmitt was named after Bosun's Mate (Bootsmannsmaat) Anton Schmitt, who was the last man at the last operating gun of the sinking light cruiser  during the Battle of Jutland on 31 May 1916 and went down with his ship. The ship was ordered from AG Weser (Deschimag) on 6 January 1936. She was laid down at Deschimag's Bremen shipyard as yard number W924 on 3 January 1938, launched on 20 September, and commissioned on 24 September 1939.

Norwegian Campaign

Z22 Anton Schmitt was allocated to Group 1 for the Norwegian portion of Operation Weserübung in April 1940. The group's task was to transport the 139th Mountain Infantry Regiment (139. Gebirgsjäger Regiment) and the headquarters of the 3rd Mountain Division (3. Gebirgs-Division) to seize Narvik. The ships began loading troops on 6 April and set sail the next day. When they arrived off the Ofotfjord on the morning of 9 April, Z22 Anton Schmitt and her sister  landed their troops at the Ramnes narrows to search for the coastal artillery positions that the Germans mistakenly believed to command the mouth of the fjord.  remained offshore to provide support if necessary and to serve as a picket ship in case the British intended to interfere with the operation. About 11:00 the troops were ordered to reboard their destroyers which proceeded to Narvik. Z22 Anton Schmitt had picket duty the following night and then sailed into Narvik harbor.

Shortly after dawn on 10 April, the five destroyers of the British 2nd Destroyer Flotilla, Hardy, Havock, Hunter, Hotspur, and Hostile appeared, totally surprising the Germans. Hunter hit Z22 Anton Schmitt with a single  shell and with a torpedo in the forward engine room. And then Havock hit the listing ship with another torpedo that broke her in half, killing or wounding over 50 crewmen. The survivors joined the other survivors ashore in an ad-hoc naval infantry unit.

Notes

References

External links
 Kriegsmarine destroyers

1938 ships
Ships built in Bremen (state)
Type 1936 destroyers
Maritime incidents in April 1940
World War II shipwrecks in the Norwegian Sea